Adipocyte plasma membrane-associated protein is a protein that in humans is encoded by the APMAP gene.

References

External links

Further reading